The Annals of the Rheumatic Diseases is a peer-reviewed medical journal. It is published by the BMJ Group on behalf of the European League Against Rheumatism and covers all aspects of rheumatology, including musculoskeletal conditions, arthritis, and connective tissue diseases. The journal publishes basic, clinical, and translational research, as well as abstracts from conferences. The journal was established in 1939. Each issue, the editor-in-chief selects a paper to be published open access as an "Editors Choice". The editor-in-chief is Josef Smolen.

Lay summaries
The journal publishes lay summaries for patients and non-clinicians that explain the findings and treatment implications arising from key research papers published in the journal. Written by BMJs Best Health team, they are also checked for accuracy by the journal's editors.

Abstracting and indexing
The journal is abstracted and indexed by the Science Citation Index Expanded, Index Medicus, Excerpta Medica, BIOSIS Previews, and Sociedad Iberoamericana de Informacion Cientifica. According to the Journal Citation Reports, its 2020 impact factor is 19.103 ranking it second out of 34 journals in the category "Rheumatology".

The journal has been cited most often by: Arthritis & Rheumatism, Annals of the Rheumatic Diseases, Rheumatology, Journal of Rheumatology, and Clinical and Experimental Rheumatology. The journals it has cited most are Arthritis & Rheumatism, Annals of the Rheumatic Diseases, Journal of Rheumatology, Rheumatology, and Journal of Immunology.

References

External links

BMJ Group academic journals
Monthly journals
Publications established in 1939
English-language journals
Rheumatology journals